Ajoy Nath Ray (born 31 October 1946) is an Indian Judge and former Chief Justice of Allahabad and Sikkim High Court.

Early life
Ray was born in 1946 in Kolkata. His father Mr. A. N. Ray was the 14th Chief Justice of India. He graduated in Science with Physics Honours from the Calcutta University and passed B.A. from the School of Jurisprudence at Oriel College, Oxford.

Career
Ray started practice as an Advocate on 4 August 1970 in the Calcutta High Court in civil matters. On 6 August 1990, he was promoted as a permanent Judge of the same High Court. In June 2004, Ray also took charge in the post of Acting Chief Justice of Calcutta High Court. He became the Chief Justice of the Allahabad High Court on 11 January 2005. Justice Ray was transferred to Sikkim High Court as Chief Justice on 27 January 2007. He retired from the judgeship on 30 October 2008.

References

1946 births
Living people
Indian judges
Chief Justices of the Allahabad High Court
Chief Justices of the Sikkim High Court
Judges of the Calcutta High Court
University of Calcutta alumni
Alumni of Oriel College, Oxford
20th-century Indian judges
20th-century Indian lawyers
Bengali people